Stylina  is a genus of extinct stony corals.

Fossil records 
This genus is known in the fossil record from the Jurassic to the Eocene (from about 175.6 to 37.2 million years ago). Fossils of species within this genus have been found in Europe, Canada, China, Colombia (Coquina Group, La Guajira), Pakistan, Paua New Guinea, Thailand, Japan, Somalia, Nigeria, Iran, Tanzania, Algeria, Tunisia, Egypt, Madagascar, Russia, Ukraine, Uzbekistan, Venezuela and Chile.

Species 
The following species of Stylina have been described:

 S. algarvensis
 S. amdoensis
 S. anthemoides
 S. arborea
 S. arkansasensis
 S. babeana
 S. bangoinensis
 S. bucheti
 S. bulbosa
 S. bulgarica
 S. bullosa
 S. carthagiensis
 S. ceriomorpha
 S. constricta
 S. cotteaui
 S. decemradiata
 S. decipiens
 S. delabechei
 S. deluci
 S. dendroidea
 S. dongqoensis
 S. dubia
 S. echinulata
 S. elegans
 S. esmuni
 S. favrei
 S. fenestralis
 S. girodi
 S. granulosa
 S. higoensis
 S. hirta
 S. hourcqi
 S. inwaldensis
 S. japonica
 S. kachensis
 S. kantoensis
 S. laevicostata
 S. lobata
 S. lortphillipsi
 S. mabutii
 S. macfadyeni
 S. madagascariensis
 S. meriani
 S. microcoenia
 S. micrommata
 S. micropora
 S. nakasai
 S. ndalakashensis
 S. niongalensis
 S. oolitica
 S. pachystylina
 S. parcicosta
 S. parvipora
 S. parviramosa
 S. perroni
 S. ploti
 S. qiebulaensis
 S. regularis
 S. reussi
 S. reussii
 S. sablensis
 S. shamoloensis
 S. sinemuriensis
 S. spissa
 S. stellata
 S. subornata
 S. subramosa
 S. sucrensis
 S. sugiyamai
 S. tenax
 S. thiessingi
 S. tubulifera
 S. tubulosa
 S. valfinensis
 S. waldeckensis

References

Further reading 
 P. Martin Duncan - 2015  A Monograph of the British Fossil Corals

Scleractinia genera
Prehistoric Anthozoa genera
Stylinidae
Toarcian first appearances
Eocene genus extinctions
Mesozoic animals of Africa
Mesozoic animals of Asia
Mesozoic animals of Europe
Mesozoic animals of North America
Mesozoic animals of South America
Cretaceous Colombia
Fossil taxa described in 1816